Smeltz is a surname. Notable people with the surname include:

 Edwin Smeltz, American politician
 Shane Smeltz (born 1981), New Zealand (association) footballer